Nu Ophiuchi (ν Oph, ν Ophiuchi) is a star in the equatorial constellation of Ophiuchus. The apparent visual magnitude is +3.3, making it one of the brighter members of this constellation.

Properties

Nu Ophiuchi has about three times the mass of the Sun and is roughly 330 million years old. The spectrum of the star matches a stellar classification of K0 IIIa, indicating it is a giant star that has exhausted the supply of hydrogen at its core and evolved away from the main sequence of stars. Unusually, it displays an anomalously low abundance of cyanogen for a star of its type. The star's outer envelope has expanded to around 14 times the Sun's radius and now radiates with a luminosity 123 times that of the Sun. This energy is emitted from its outer envelope at an effective temperature of 4,928 K, giving it the cool, orange hue of a K-type star.

Companions
This is not a binary star system in the sense of having a gravitationally-bound stellar companion. However, in November 2003, a brown dwarf companion Nu Ophiuchi b was discovered. This sub-stellar companion has at least 21.9 times the mass of Jupiter and takes 536 days (1.47 years) to complete an orbit. A second brown dwarf companion was discovered in 2010, orbiting further from the star with a period of 3,169 days (8.68 years). These have been confirmed in 2012. Two brown dwarfs are locked in 1:6 orbital resonance.

Naming
This star is sometimes called by the name Sinistra, meaning left side in Latin, although authors like Jim Kaler recommend not using this name, and instead stick to the Bayer designation only (Nu Ophiuchi).

The stars in this group include ν Ophiuchi, δ Herculis, λ Herculis, μ Herculis, ο Herculis, 112 Herculis, ζ Aquilae, θ1 Serpentis, η Serpentis,  ξ Serpentis and η Ophiuchi.

See also
 Tau Geminorum

References

Ophiuchi, Nu
Ophiuchus (constellation)
K-type giants
Brown dwarfs
Planetary systems with two confirmed planets
Ophiuchi, 64
088048
6698
163917
Durchmusterung objects
J17590160-0946249